Settle is a railway station on the Settle and Carlisle Line, which runs between  and  via Settle. It is owned by Network Rail and managed by Northern Trains.

The market town is also served by the railway station at Giggleswick, situated about a mile to the south-west, which is on the Bentham Line, running  between Leeds and Morecambe via Lancaster.

History and facilities

The station was designed by the Midland Railway company architect John Holloway Sanders. The station was opened with the line on 1 May 1876 and was originally named Settle New to distinguish it from the nearby station on a different route, which was renamed  at the same time. Settle New was renamed Settle on 1 July 1879, by which time Settle Old had become Giggleswick.  Goods facilities were withdrawn from the station in 1970.

The station was Grade II listed on 9 March 1984.

The railway station is located very close to the town centre and is staffed on a part-time basis. There is a range of facilities available (including waiting room, toilets and a souvenir shop) in the main buildings on the southbound platform. There is a period stone-built waiting room located on the northbound platform and a new stone and glass shelter on the southbound side.

The platforms are linked by an ex-North British Railway footbridge that was formerly located at  station in East Lothian until electrification of the ECML made it redundant. It was then dismantled and re-erected here in 1993 to allow the old barrow crossing at the north end of the station to be taken out of regular use (though the crossing is still available for wheelchair users when the station is staffed).

A ticket machine is available for use when the booking office is closed.  Train running information is provided by timetable posters, a P.A system and telephone.  Digital information screens were also installed here in the summer of 2019.

The former Settle Station signalbox, which has been out of railway use since 1984, was relocated further north to be adjacent to the Down platform in 1997, and is open to the public on most Saturdays.

The water tower situated near the station in the former goods yard was converted into residential accommodation in 2011.

Stationmasters

J. Smith 1876 - 1879 
Richard Allcock 1879 - 1883
Benjamin Ash 1883 - 1905 
Arthur Reedman Snow 1906 - ca. 1911
Abraham Fearn ca. 1914 - 1924 (formerly station master at Oxenhope, afterwards station master at Clay Cross)
Harold Tilforth 1924 - 1925 (resigned to avoid being dealt with for a cash irregularity) 
John Banks ca. 1939 - 1946
Thomas William Whetten from 1946 (formerly station master at Kirby Lonsdale)
Harry Robinson
James M. Taylor 1959 - 1965 (formerly station master at Horton in Ribblesdale)

Accidents and incidents
On 21 January 1960, an express passenger train derailed just to the north of the station (near the village of Langcliffe) and then collided with a northbound freight due to a defect on the BR Standard Class 7 locomotive hauling it. Five people were killed and nine were injured.

Services

A replacement bus service was in operation over the affected section until the project to repair the line was completed in March 2017. The project was completed on schedule and the line reopened to traffic on 31 March 2017.

The new Northern franchise awarded to Arriva Rail North in December 2015 and which started in April 2016, has seen modest service improvements from the station implemented from the May 2018 timetable change, with one extra weekday service each way and two extra trains each way on Sundays.

References

Further reading

 Anderson, V.R. and Fox, G.K. Stations and Structures of the Settle & Carlisle Railway, Oxford Publishing Company, 1986. .

External links
 

Railway stations in North Yorkshire
DfT Category E stations
Former Midland Railway stations
Railway stations in Great Britain opened in 1876
Northern franchise railway stations
Grade II listed buildings in North Yorkshire
Settle, North Yorkshire